Haggard is a British TV comedy series, which aired from 1990 to 1992. Starring Keith Barron, Reece Dinsdale, Sam Kelly and William Simons.

It was made for the ITV network by Yorkshire Television, and based on Squire Haggard's Journal by Michael Green, more famous for his The Art of Coarse... books.

The series is set during 1777–1778, in the Georgian era, and was about the exploits of Squire Haggard, the Squire's 25-year-old son Roderick, and their servant Grunge.

The show makes use of the production style known as breaking the fourth wall as Fanny Foulacre, Roderick's girlfriend, makes asides to the camera, commenting upon the situations she finds herself in.

Cast members
 Keith Barron — as "Squire Amos Haggard"
 Reece Dinsdale — as his son, "Roderick Haggard"
 Sam Kelly — as their servant, "Nathanial Grunge"
 Sara Crowe — as "Fanny Foulacre" (Series 1)
 Michael Jayston — as "Sir Joshua Foulacre" (Series 1)
 William Simons — as "the Landlord"

Plot
The poverty-stricken Squire Amos Haggard, who is a former friend of the Prince of Wales, is desperate for money and is always plotting for ways in which he can recoup the family fortune.

The Squire's son, Roderick, is idealistic and falls in love very easily.  Roderick is more interested in beautiful young ladies than he is in money, and his foolishness often brings his father's schemes undone.

Nathanial Grunge, their servant, is richer than his two masters, and would like to be free of them to pursue his own dreams (something he finds impossible to do because the Squire often uses Grunge's money in his get-rich-quick schemes).

References

External links
 
 Comedy Guide – Haggard at BBC Online
 Haggard – British TV comedy
 Haggard – TV.com

Cultural depictions of George IV
1990 British television series debuts
1992 British television series endings
1990s British sitcoms
ITV sitcoms
Television series set in the 1770s
Television series by ITV Studios
Television series by Yorkshire Television
English-language television shows